"Chainsaw" is the third episode of the horror black comedy series Scream Queens. It premiered on September 29, 2015, on Fox. The episode was both directed and written by Ian Brennan. In this episode, the Red Devil continues the terror on campus using a chainsaw. Chanel (Emma Roberts) finds a new project in Hester (Lea Michele), and Dean Munsch (Jamie Lee Curtis) appoints a new Wallace University mascot while trying to separate Gigi (Nasim Pedrad) and Wes (Oliver Hudson)'s budding relationship as Chad (Glen Powell) and Earl Grey (Lucien Laviscount) lead their fraternity on a witch hunt for the Red Devil.

The episode was watched by 3.46 million viewers and received mixed to positive reviews from critics, most of them citing it as an improvement from the two previous episodes.

Plot

Grace (Skyler Samuels) and Zayday (Keke Palmer) are at the supermarket to buy food for Kappa. Grace sees the Red Devil running towards her and she tases him and Zayday knocks the shelves to stop him. It is revealed that he is someone from Zayday's class who just tried to scare them. Due to Chanel #2 (Ariana Grande)'s mysterious "absence", Zayday and Grace enter her room and find a blood stain, while Denise (Niecy Nash) enters and confirms it. That leads them to think that she was murdered, but Chanel #2 is still posting pictures on her Instagram from an unknown location. They decide to visit her parents in Bel Air, California to find out what happened. They tell her parents, Dr. Herfmann (Roger Bart) and Mrs. Herfmann (Charisma Carpenter) that she is missing but is still posting pictures. It is revealed that her real name is Sonya. Her parents reveal that she had a drinking problem and she used to date Chad Radwell (Glen Powell) (later it was revealed that every Chanel had dated/hooked-up with him behind Chanel (Emma Roberts)'s back). They tell them that Sonya got better when she dated Chad. They also show them that Chad wrote her a letter. They tell Zayday, Grace, and Denise to find her and tell her not to go home ever again.

At a candle-light vigil held for Boone, Dean Cathy Munsch (Jamie Lee Curtis), reads a statement announcing that Tiffany's death was an accident and that Boone's death was a suicide, angering the Kappa's and the Dickie Dollar Scholars. Because the supposed killer is dressed as the schools mascot, the Dean introduces a new university mascot, Coney. Coney has his 15 minutes of fame before being decapitated by the Red Devil, in his dorm room, using a chainsaw. Out of frustration by the murders and Chanel's apathetic attitude, Chanel #5 (Abigail Breslin), decides not to help her find Chanel's #2's missing body from the freezer, and instead she says she is having fun threesomes with twin members of the Dickie Dollar Scholars Roger (Aaron Rhodes) and Dodger (Austin Rhodes). Chanel, realizing she can make the outcast pledge popular after seeing Hester (Lea Michele) sneaking around her closet, decides to give her a makeover, taking her neckbrace off, and making Hester her new minion, Chanel #6. Chanel #5 is outraged by this as she's mad that Chanel made a pledge a Chanel. Meanwhile, Chanel #3 (Billie Lourd) befriends the "Predatory Lesbian" Sam (Jeanna Han), and tells her a secret; that she is the biological daughter of Charles Manson and that her step-father is a billionaire. The two promise to alibi each other if anyone else is killed.

Grace later learns that her father, Wes (Oliver Hudson), is her film analysis teacher, and they argue, resulting in Grace leaving. He plays The Texas Chain Saw Massacre during class and Gigi (Nasim Pedrad) enters. Dean Munsch sees them together and when she and Gigi play tennis, she tells Gigi to back off from Wes. Next, Cathy and Gigi move to the Kappa house for a week, much to Chanel's anger. Meanwhile, Chad and Earl Grey (Lucien Laviscount) encourage The Dickie Dollar Scholars fraternity to organize a witch hunt, to avenge Boone (Nick Jonas)'s "death", as the police aren't doing anything. The frat brothers start their witch hunt by getting baseball bats and they start smashing a red car in the middle of the street and the Red Devil appears with a chainsaw on one side and another person in a Red Devil costume appears on the other. The frat brothers fight the Devils which results in Chad being knocked out and Caulfield losing both arms.

Grace visits Pete (Diego Boneta) and apologizes for ignoring his messages since she assumed that he is the Red Devil and both tell each other new clues they found, including a girl who was 2 credits away from graduating 20 years ago and think she's Sophia (McKaley Miller), and one of the other girls on the list, whose name is the only one still currently in the system. Denise starts to obsessively suspect that Zayday is the killer due to the evidence that she owns a chainsaw. Denise ends up letting her go since Zayday explains that the chainsaw is protection from her grandma. Wes, Cathy, and Gigi are having a salad together when Zayday comes across them. Wes asks her where Grace is, and she doesn't know. Wes calls Grace, who lies to him by saying she's at the library when actually, she is at a gas station with Pete.

When Cathy and Gigi are about to sleep, Cathy turns a noise machine on with different sounds on a high volume, bothering Gigi. Gigi ends up sleeping on the couch downstairs, the Red Devil appears and chases Gigi with the chainsaw. Wes, who was asleep in his car hears her screaming and runs to help her and in the process, he gets his arm cut with the chainsaw. Gigi then flips one of the couches and knocks the Red Devil over. Gigi tells the girls to call 911. Wes and Gigi then look over the flipped couch to only see the chainsaw running with no Red Devil. Cathy then runs down the stairs and asks what's going on, Wes grabs the chainsaw and tells her not to take another step until the police arrive and accuses her of being the killer.

Production
Niecy Nash returns as special guest star portraying Denise Hemphill, the odd security guard. Returning recurring characters in this episode include Kappa pledges Jennifer "Candle Vlogger" (Breezy Eslin), Sam "Predatory Lez" (Jeanna Han), and Dickie Dollar Scholars fraternity members Caulfield (Evan Paley), and twins Roger and Dodger (Aaron and Austin Rhodes). Before the series started, back on June 24, 2015, it was announced that Charisma Carpenter and Roger Bart had been cast in a guest role as Chanel #2 (Ariana Grande)'s parents. They made their guest appearance in this episode, as Dr. and Mrs. Herfmann, the wealthy parents of Chanel #2, whose name was revealed to be Sonya in this episode.

Reception

Ratings
Chainsaw was watched live by 3.46 million U.S. viewers and got a 1.4 rating/5 share in the adult 18-49 demographic.

Critical reception
"Chainsaw" received mixed to positive review from critics, most of them citing that it was an improvement over the first two episodes. LaToya Ferguson from The A.V. Club gave the episode a "B−" and stated that there were "moments in the episode that really worked and created a sense of anticipation that was truly missing in those first two episodes." TV.com's Lily Sparks said that she "enjoyed the third episode maybe three times more than the premiere." Dr. Zaius from Geeks of the Doom cited "I wish they would tone down the silliness, and lean towards the darker side a bit. [...] I enjoyed this week’s show – the show takes nothing seriously, and at times it works very well."

In a much more positive review, Terri Schwartz from IGN said "the FOX series runs the risk of over-complicating itself. Still, the humor remains biting and hilarious and the cast delivers committed, clever performances, and Scream Queens remains a joy to watch." Caralynn Lippo, from TV Fanatic, gave the episode 4 out of 5 stars, citing that Chainsaw "somehow managed to up the campy quotient that was already prevalent in the series premiere."

References

2015 American television episodes
Scream Queens (2015 TV series) episodes